Aurangabad district is one of the thirty-eight districts of Bihar state, India. It is currently a part of the Red Corridor.

Aurangabad played a major role in the Indian independence struggle, and is also the birthplace of eminent nationalist & first Deputy Chief Minister of state, Bihar Vibhuti Dr. Anugrah Narayan Sinha, a participant of Champaran Satyagraha who is regarded among makers of modern independent Bihar.

Geography
Aurangabad town is the administrative headquarters of this district. Aurangabad district is a part of Magadh division.

Aurangabad became a fully-fledged district when it was split from the Gaya district in 1972.

Economy
In 2006, the Indian government named Aurangabad one of the country's 250 most backward districts (out of a total of 640). It is one of the 36 districts in Bihar currently receiving funds from the Backward Regions Grant Fund Programme (BRGF).

History
Aurangabad is known as "Chittorgarh of Bihar" due to preponderance of Rajputs. Since the independence of India, the Aurangabad Lok Sabha Constituency, which forms a part of Aurangabad district has elected Member of Parliament from Rajput caste only. This district has  remained a hotbed of Dalit assertion as a part of Naxalite-Maoist insurgency. It has also witnessed caste wars between the Rajput landlords and  Dalits, the latter were led in this struggle by the peasant castes like Koeri and Yadav.

Demographics

According to the 2011 census Aurangabad district, Bihar has a population of 2,540,073, roughly equal to the nation of Kuwait or the US state of Nevada. This gives it a ranking of 172nd in India (out of a total of 640). Its population growth rate over the decade 2001–2011 was 24.75%. Aurangabad has a sex ratio of 916 females for every 1000 males, and a literacy rate of 72.77%. 9.32% of the population lives in urban areas. Scheduled Castes and Scheduled Tribes make up 24.10% and 0.04% of the population respectively.

At the time of the 2011 census, 69.69% of the population spoke Magahi, 24.68% Hindi and 5.17% Urdu as their first language.

Politics 
  

|}

See also
 Barun, India town in Aurangabad District
 Daudnagar, A major town of Aurangabad district
 Deo, town in Aurangabad district
 Surkhi, a village in Aurangabad district

References

External links
 Aurangabad information portal

 
Magadh division
Districts of Bihar
1973 establishments in Bihar